USS Sotoyomo (YTM-9/YT-9/Harbor Tug No.9) was a harbor tug built at the turn of the twentieth century.  She saw service in both World War I and World War II and was heavily damaged by the Attack on Pearl Harbor. The name Sotoyomo commemorates a part of the war-like Sioux tribe of Indians. Sotoyomo was the oldest vessel at Pearl Harbor in service at the time of the attack.

History
Sotoyomo was laid down 2 March 1903, at Mare Island Navy Yard, Vallejo, California, she was launched 20 August 1903. She served in both World War I and World War II.

Attack on Pearl Harbor

Sotoyomo was in floating dry dock  with  undergoing overhaul when Pearl Harbor was attacked 7 December 1941.  Explosions and fires on Shaw greatly damaged Sotoyomo which resulted in total submersion.  Originally Sotoyomo was deemed a total loss, but she was later refloated, repaired, and rehabilitated.

Further service in World War II
Sotoyomo served throughout World War II in various locations across the Pacific including Naval Base Noumea, Naval Base Guadalcanal and  Naval Base Philippines at Naval Base Leyte. In Leyte on September 1945 she was declared in very poor shape and taken out of service. On 15 February 1946 she was scuttled off Leyte. She was struck from the Naval Register on 26 February 1946.

Awards

References

Notes

Sotoyomo (Harbor Tug No.9)
Sotoyomo (Harbor Tug No.9)
Tugs of the United States Navy
World War II auxiliary ships of the United States
Sotoyomo (YT-9)
Sotoyomo (YT-9)